Akhmetovo (Äxmät) is a rural locality (a village) in Kucherbayevsky Selsoviet, Blagovarsky District, Bashkortostan, Russia. The population was 139 as of 2010. There are 3 streets.

Geography 
Akhmetovo is located 31 km north of Yazykovo (the district's administrative centre) by road. Tyurkeyevo is the nearest rural locality.

References 

Rural localities in Blagovarsky District